David Fuller (born 4 September 1954) is an engineer, convicted English murderer and necrophile. 

In 2021, he was convicted of the murders of Wendy Knell, 25, and Caroline Pierce, 20, whom he strangled and sexually assaulted after breaking into their homes, months apart in 1987, in Royal Tunbridge Wells, Kent, in what became known as the Bedsit murders. The killer's DNA had been known since a cold case review in 2007, and analysis of the samples in the two cases would later prove that the murders were committed by the same unidentified perpetrator. Fuller was eventually identified as the perpetrator in 2020 when a match was made between his DNA and the samples from the case. When finally apprehended Fuller also received 12 years for mortuary offences, having recorded himself abusing the bodies of more than 100 female corpses, over the course of his employment as an electrician at the Kent and Sussex Hospital, also in Tunbridge Wells, and the Tunbridge Wells Hospital in nearby Pembury which replaced it. 

He was sentenced to life imprisonment with a whole life order on 15 December 2021, meaning that he will serve his life sentence without the possibility of parole.

In October 2021, Fuller was charged with an additional 16 offences committed at mortuaries in the now-closed Kent and Sussex Hospital, and its successor, the Tunbridge Wells hospital at Pembury, between 2007 and 2020, and pleaded guilty to the charges on 3 November 2022. He is imprisoned at HMP Frankland, alongside other prisoners such as Wayne Couzens and Michael Stone.

Personal life 
Fuller was married three times. He met his first victim, Wendy Knell, at the SupaSnaps store where she was the manager; he often took in his photographs to be developed there.

He was interested in birdwatching, cycling and photography. He was an unofficial photographer for London rock band Cutting Crew and in 1985 accompanied them on tour with his second wife Sally.

References

1954 births
20th-century British criminals
British male criminals
British people convicted of murder
British prisoners sentenced to life imprisonment
Criminals from Kent
Living people
Necrophiles
People convicted of murder by England and Wales
Prisoners sentenced to life imprisonment by England and Wales